Lars Ramkilde Knudsen (born 21 February 1962) is a Danish researcher in cryptography, particularly interested in the design and analysis of block ciphers, hash functions and message authentication codes (MACs).

Academic
After some early work in banking, Knudsen enrolled at Aarhus University in 1984 studying mathematics and computer science, gaining an MSc in 1992 and a PhD in 1994. From 1997-2001, he worked at the University of Bergen, Norway. Currently, Knudsen is a professor in the Department of Mathematics at the Technical University of Denmark. Ivan Damgård was Lars' mentor during his studies at Aarhus University. His Ph.D. was refereed by Bart Preneel.

Publications
Knudsen has published a couple of papers on cryptanalysis of cryptographic primitives, including the R-MAC scheme, the SHA-1 and MD2 hash functions, and a couple of block ciphers: DES, DFC, IDEA, ICE, LOKI, MISTY, RC2, RC5, RC6, SC2000, Skipjack, Square and SAFER.

Knudsen was involved in designing some ciphers: AES candidates DEAL and Serpent (the latter in conjunction with Ross Anderson and Eli Biham).  He was involved in designing Grøstl, a hash function which was one of the submissions to the NIST SHA-3 competition (it was not the winner).

He introduced the technique of impossible differential cryptanalysis and integral cryptanalysis.

References

External links

 Homepage
 Some publications

1962 births
Living people
Modern cryptographers
Danish scientists
Danish computer scientists
Academic staff of the University of Bergen
Academic staff of the Technical University of Denmark
Aarhus University alumni